Halkyn Castle is a mansion house in the village of Halkyn, Flintshire, Wales.  The house, with its associated stable block, is designated by Cadw as a Grade II* listed building.

History

The house was designed by the architect John Buckler and built between 1824 and 1827 for Robert Grosvenor, who was at the time the 2nd Earl Grosvenor, and later the 1st Marquess of Westminster. The building of the castle was supervised by Benjamin Gummow, the Earl's architect and surveyor.  It was used as a sporting lodge and, on occasions, for living accommodation.  In 1886 the Chester firm of architects, Douglas and Fordham, added an extension in Elizabethan style for the 1st Duke of Westminster.  The extension consisted of a wing containing a new drawing room.  Internal alterations were made which included a staircase, and a chimneypiece in the dining room.

Architecture

The house is built in buff ashlar stone.  Most of the windows are mullioned and transomed.  Its more striking architectural features include castellated walls, towers, turrets, and many chimney stacks.

Grounds
Of the original grounds of Halkyn Castle there is still a grand but mainly informal garden and a small park dating from when the house was constructed. Walks have been laid out through an informal ornamental woodland, a small formal terraced garden and a small ornamental walled garden.

Listing
Halkyn Castle is a grade II* listed building because it is and early example of a castellated mansion, which is still well preserved, which was built by an important practitioner of the style for an important regional aristocratic family.

The parks and gardens are listed as Grade II in the Cadw/ICOMOS Register of Parks and Gardens of Special Historic Interest in Wales.

See also
List of houses and associated buildings by John Douglas

References

Grade II* listed buildings in Flintshire
Grade II* listed houses
Castles in Flintshire
John Douglas buildings
Houses completed in 1827
1827 establishments in the United Kingdom
Registered historic parks and gardens in Flintshire